Chouchi, or Qiuchi, was a dynastic state of China ruled by the Yang clan of Di ethnicity in modern-day Gansu Province. Its existence spanned both the Sixteen Kingdoms and Northern and Southern dynasties periods, but it is not listed among one of these regimes in historiography.

History
At the beginning of the 3rd century CE Yang Teng (楊騰), chieftain of the White Neck Di (白項氐), had occupied the southeast area of modern Gansu province, at the upper course of the Han River. His followers Yang Ju (楊駒) and Yang Qianwan (楊千萬) paid tribute to the emperors of the Cao-Wei Dynasty and were rewarded with the title of prince (wáng 王).
Yang Feilong (楊飛龍) shifted the center of the Chouchi realm back to Lüeyang, where his successor Yang Maosou (楊茂捜) reigned as an independent king at the beginning of the 4th century. The Chouchi troops often plundered territories in the Central Plains to the east and abducted people there, but the troops of Eastern Jin and Former Zhao deprived the Chouchi empire of some of its people. In 322 Yang Nandi (楊難敵) suffered a defeat at the hands of Former Zhao and was degraded to prince of Wudu (武都王) and duke of Chouchi (仇池公). The following years were characterized by numerous internal struggles among the Yang clan and several usurpations of the throne. The rulers were not seen as mere regional inspectors (cishi 刺史) or governors (taishou 太守) of their region under the government of Jin.

In 371 Fu Jian, ruler of Former Qin, attacked Chouchi, captured the ruler Yang Cuan (楊篡) and ended the period of Former Chouchi.

Yang Ding, a great-great-grandson of Yang Maosou, and a son-in-law of Fu Jian, resurrected the Chouchi kingdom in 385, with the capital at Licheng (歷城). His younger brother Yang Sheng (楊盛) was able to conquer the region of Liangzhou (梁州) at the upper course of the Han River, and declared himself governor for the Jin Dynasty. Efforts to occupy the territory of modern Sichuan failed, but Chouchi controlled a large part of the modern provinces of Gansu (east) and Shaanxi (south).

After 443, the lords of Chouchi were only puppet rulers controlled by the Northern and Southern dynasties. Historians talk of the five realms of Chouchi (Chouchi wuguo 仇池五國): Former and Later Chouchi (Qianchouchi 前仇池, Houchouchi 後仇池), Wudu (武都), Yinping (陰平),  and Wuxing (武興). Former Chouchi lasted between 296 and 371 while Later Chouchi lasted between 385 and 443. The Wudu period between 443 and 477 can be seen as a continuation of Later Chouchi. After the death of Yang Wendu in 477, the realm split into Yinping and Wuxing.

Rulers

References

See also
Di
Wu Hu
List of past Chinese ethnic groups

 
Former countries in Chinese history
Dynasties in Chinese history
Ancient peoples of China
296 establishments